Bill Byrge (born July 16, 1932) is an American character actor and comedian, best known for his work as Bobby in various Ernest P. Worrell projects.

Career
In 1986, Byrge began appearing alongside longtime co-star Gailard Sartain in a series of "Me and My Brother Bobby" commercials, produced by the Nashville advertising company Carden and Cherry, the same company responsible for the Ernest P. Worrell commercials with Jim Varney. Basic premise was Sartain and Byrge were, "Twin brothers who didn't look anything alike", while the schtick was loud-mouth Chuck (Sartain) would endorse a certain product, and in some cases, would bungle something in the process, while his quiet and collected twin brother Bobby (Byrge) would mostly agree with whatever Chuck's sentiments were with a simple, yet enthusiastic nod.

Later in 1988, the actors would reprise their roles in their own recurring sketches on the Saturday morning children's show, Hey Vern, It's Ernest!, where, depending on the episode's specific theme, the brothers would usually get involved with whatever situation that Ernest was involving himself in, such as a bake sale or a talent show, for example. Later still, the characters were also featured in a number of the theatrical Ernest movies, in a variety of odd jobs, such as airline cargo attendants in Ernest Saves Christmas and security guards in Ernest Goes to Jail; it is also revealed in the Ernest movies that Chuck and Bobby are Ernest's next-door neighbors. Afterwards, Sartain was absent from remaining Ernest films, but Byrge continued to portray Bobby, and was paired with somewhat similar characters, including a younger brother Tom (Dallas native John Cadenhead) in Ernest Scared Stupid, and alongside Linda Kash's character Gerta in Ernest Goes to School which was filmed in Vancouver, British Columbia. In the original commercials and Ernest TV series, Bobby never speaks, but will occasionally mouth what he is trying to say, or even hold up a sign with his thoughts written on it; in the following Ernest movies however, Bobby actually did speak, even if only a line or two.

Post-Ernest
Byrge has done little acting since the demise of the Ernest franchise; however, in later years, he did reprise his role as Bobby once again for an independent DVD movie, alongside Billy Dee (who also is the webmaster of the official Ernest/Jim Varney fansite), entitled Billy and Bobby the Whacky Duo On Vacation. In the movie, buddies Billy and Bobby go on roadtrip, but before they do, Billy needs to teach Bobby how to drive (which reflects Byrge's real-life lack of driving skills); Bobby also has a lot of dialogue in the movie as well. Byrge has also been involved in a number of music videos and theater productions in his hometown of Nashville.

Personal life
Bill was born in Campbell County, Tennessee, to Martha Bunch.  Being born during the Great Depression meant limited food and as a child he was diagnosed with rickets due to a lack of a well rounded diet. Byrge currently resides in Nashville; his brother, Charlie, and sister, Naomi, are now deceased. He does not drive, as living downtown everything is within walking distance, and because of his sentiments that people of Tennessee don't know how to drive.

Filmography

References

External links 
 

1932 births
American stand-up comedians
American male film actors
American male television actors
People from Nashville, Tennessee
Living people
Comedians from Tennessee
20th-century American male actors